Kevin Craig Koslofski (born September 24, 1966) is a former Major League Baseball outfielder who played for four seasons. He played for the Kansas City Royals from 1992 to 1994 and the Milwaukee Brewers in 1996.

After attending Maroa-Forsyth High School in Maroa, Illinois, Koslofski was drafted and signed by the Royals in June 1984. He made his MLB debut eight years later on June 28, 1992, leading off for Kansas City and collecting three hits in a 9–2 victory over the Baltimore Orioles at Camden Yards.

Koslofski ended that 1992 season with three home runs and a batting average of .248. He batted only 30 times for the Royals over the next two seasons, however. He signed with Milwaukee as a free agent and appeared in 25 games for the Brewers in his final season, 1996.

External links

1966 births
Living people
Major League Baseball outfielders
Baseball players from Illinois
Milwaukee Brewers players
Kansas City Royals players
Sportspeople from Decatur, Illinois
American people of Polish descent
Baseball City Royals players
Eugene Emeralds players
Fort Myers Royals players
Gulf Coast Royals players
Louisville Redbirds players
Memphis Chicks players
New Orleans Zephyrs players
Omaha Royals players